Ethan Kai Young (born 13 January 2004) is an English professional footballer who plays as a defender for Yaxley FC, on loan from Vanarama National League club Scunthorpe United.

Playing career
Young joined Scunthorpe United in 2020 as a youth team scholar. He made his first appearance for Scunthorpe on 9 April 2022 in a 4-0 defeat to Mansfield Town. Only six days later, Young made his first start for the club in a defeat away to Leyton Orient.

On 22 April 2022, Young signed his first professional contract with Scunthorpe alongside fellow academy graduate Jack Moore-Billam. It was a one-year contract with the option to extend for a further season.

Style of play
Young is a left-footed central defender.

Personal life
He was a former student at Stamford Welland Academy.

References

External links

2004 births
Living people
English footballers
Sportspeople from Peterborough
Association football defenders
Scunthorpe United F.C. players
English Football League players